This is a list of athletics clubs in Luxembourg.  It includes only clubs that compete at track and field and that are affiliated to the Luxembourg Athletics Federation, the governing body for athletics in Luxembourg.

List of clubs
 CA Belvaux, Belvaux
 CS Nord Clervaux, Clervaux
 Celtic Diekirch, Diekirch
 CA Dudelange, Dudelange
 Road Runners Echternach, Echternach
 CA Fola Esch, Esch-sur-Alzette
 CAPA Ettelbruck, Ettelbruck
 CA Est Grevenmacher, Grevenmacher
 CAL Spora Luxembourg, Luxembourg City
 CA Schifflange, Schifflange
 RBUA Pétange, Pétange
 Lafclub Walfer Huesen, Bereldange

References
 Fédération Luxembourgeoise d'Athlétisme list of competition clubs

Athletics clubs
Luxembourg clubs
Athletics clubs